Compactozetidae is a family of mites belonging to the order Oribatida.

Genera:
 Cepheus Koch, 1835
 Compactozetes Hammer, 1966
 Conoppia Berlese, 1908
 Eupterotegaeus Berlese, 1916
 Hamotegeus Balogh & Mahunka, 1969
 Hypocepheus Krivolusky, 1971
 Ommatocepheus Berlese, 1913
 Oribatodes Banks, 1895
 Pilocepheus Pérez-Íñigo, 1992
 Protocepheus Jacot, 1928
 Reticulocepheus Vasiliu & Calugar, 1977
 Sadocepheus Aoki, 1965
 Sphodrocepheus Woolley & Higgins, 1963
 Tereticepheus Bernini, 1990
 Tikizetes Hammer, 1967
 Tritegeus Berlese, 1913

References

Acari